The Social and Civic Agreement (ACyS) was a center-left congressional alliance in Argentina, integrated by the Radical Civic Union (UCR) the Socialist Party (PS) and the Civic Coalition ARI (CC-ARI), which acted as an umbrella national electoral alliance at the last 2009 Argentine legislative elections. The Civic Coalition, which was a founder member of the Social and Civic Agreement, left the alliance on 12 August 2010.

Background
During the 2008 conflicts between the Argentine Government and the agricultural sector, most factions of the parties that would later ally themselves into the ACyS took a strong stance against the National Government's agricultural policy. Previously, at the 2007 presidential elections, the Civic Coalition and the Socialist Party ran on a joint presidential ticket, and - since 2005 - both parties plus the Radical Civic Union make up the Progressive, Civic and Social Front alliance in Santa Fe Province that won the provincial Governorship on 2 September 2007 for socialist Hermes Binner.

2009 legislative elections
The ACyS was composed of the following parties in each Province:

References

See also

Politics of Argentina

Defunct political party alliances in Argentina